Făgețel may refer to several villages in Romania:

 Făgețel, a village in Itești Commune, Bacău County
 Făgețel, a village in Frumoasa, Harghita
 Făgețel, a village in Remetea, Harghita
 Făgețel, a village in Dobra, Hunedoara

Other 
 Făgețel River (disambiguation)

See also 
 Făget (disambiguation)
 Făgetu (disambiguation)